Henry Bucknall Betterton, 1st Baron Rushcliffe, GBE, PC (15 August 1872 – 18 November 1949), known as Sir Henry Betterton, Bt, between 1929 and 1935, was a British barrister and Conservative politician. He served as Minister of Labour under Ramsay MacDonald between 1931 and 1934.

Background and education
Betterton was the son of Henry Inman Betterton, of Woodville, Leicestershire, and Agnes, daughter of Samuel Bucknall. He was educated at Rugby and Christ Church, Oxford, and was called to the Bar, Inner Temple, in 1896. He practiced for some years at the Chancery Bar.

Political career

Betterton was elected Member of Parliament for Rushcliffe in Nottingham in 1918. He served under Stanley Baldwin as Parliamentary Secretary to the Ministry of Labour between 1923 and 1924 and again between 1924 and 1929. When the National Government was formed in 1931 he was sworn of the Privy Council and made Minister of Labour under Ramsay MacDonald, a post he held until 1934, when he left the House of Commons after appointment as the chair of the Unemployment Assistance Board.

Betterton was appointed an Officer of the Order of the British Empire (OBE) in 1918 and a Commander of the Order of the British Empire (CBE) in 1920. He was made a Baronet, of Blackfordby in the County of Leicester, in 1929 and raised to the peerage as Baron Rushcliffe, of Blackfordby in the County of Leicester, in 1935. In 1941 he was appointed a Knight Grand Cross of the Order of the British Empire.

He chaired the Nurses Salaries Committee which was established in October 1941.

Family
Lord Rushcliffe was twice married. He married firstly Violet, daughter of J. G. Gilliat, in 1912. They had two daughters. After her death in October 1947 he married secondly Inez Alfreda, daughter of Alfred Lubbock and widow of Sir Harold Edward Snagge, in 1948. Rushcliffe died in November 1949, aged 77, when the baronetcy and barony became extinct. His second wife died in May 1955.

Arms

See also
 Report of the Commission on the Palestine Disturbances of August, 1929, Cmd. 3530

References

External links 

Rushcliffe, Henry Betterton, 1st Baron
Rushcliffe, Henry Betterton, 1st Baron
Rushcliffe, Henry Betterton, 1st Baron
Conservative Party (UK) MPs for English constituencies
Rushcliffe, Henry Betterton, 1st Baron
Rushcliffe, Henry Betterton, 1st Baron
UK MPs 1918–1922
UK MPs 1922–1923
UK MPs 1923–1924
UK MPs 1924–1929
UK MPs 1929–1931
UK MPs 1931–1935
UK MPs who were granted peerages
Rushcliffe, Henry Betterton, 1st Baron
Rushcliffe, Henry Betterton, 1st Baron
Barons created by George V